İlkem Özkaynak (born 1 May 1982) is a Turkish former professional footballer who played as a left fullback.

References

1983 births
People from Kırklareli
Living people
Turkish footballers
Turkey youth international footballers
Association football defenders
Dardanelspor footballers
Kayseri Erciyesspor footballers
MKE Ankaragücü footballers
Antalyaspor footballers
Kırklarelispor footballers
Adanaspor footballers
Edirnespor footballers
Association football fullbacks
Süper Lig players
TFF First League players
TFF Second League players